Welcome Back is a 2015 Indian Hindi-language action crime comedy film directed by Anees Bazmee and produced by Firoz A. Nadiadwala. A sequel to the 2007 film Welcome, it features an ensemble cast that includes Anil Kapoor, Nana Patekar, John Abraham, Shruti Haasan, Shiney Ahuja, Ankita Shrivastava, with Dimple Kapadia, Paresh Rawal and Naseeruddin Shah. While Kapoor, Patekar, Rawal, Karnik, Irani, Josh, Dabi, Khan and Ranjeet have reprised their roles from the previous film, Abraham and Hassan are new additions to the lead cast. Made on a budget of ₹88 crore, the film was largely shot in and around Dubai, United Arab Emirates. Welcome Back was released worldwide on 4 September 2015.

Plot

Uday Shetty and Majnu Pandey end a life of crime and become honest businessmen, settling in Dubai after being duped by Uday's brother-in-law Rajiv. Two conwomen from India, Poonam  and Babita, pose as Maharani Padmavati and Rajkumari Chandni of Najafgarh in order to con Uday and Majnu of their money. Babita gains the attraction of the two men, thus getting them to finance herself and Poonam's luxurious lifestyle. Later, it is revealed that Uday has another sister Ranjana  from his father, Shankar Shetty's third marriage and Majnu and Uday are emotionally blackmailed by Shankar into arranging the marriage of Ranjana and are also forced to do so as Poonam makes it one of her conditions for getting Babita married to either one of them.

The film then shifts to Rajiv's uncle, Dr. Ghunguroo, who has found out that he has a step son named Ajju from his wife's previous marriage that he was unaware. Unlike Rajiv, Ajju is a local goon of Mumbai, where Ranjana studies. Through a chain of hilarious events, they both fall in love with each other. Meanwhile, Majnu and Uday arrange the marriage of Ranjana with the step-son of Doctor Ghunguroo, not knowing that he is a goon. However, at the engagement ceremony, Majnu reveals the truth, causing Ajju to retaliate with a fight, threatening to marry Ranjana without any of the brothers' consent.

Expecting to keep Ajju at bay, Uday and Majnu visit Wanted Bhai, who is an infamous blind don. They also return to their old, violent ways in order to kill Ajju. The brothers are shocked to find that Wanted Bhai's son Honey likes Ranjana and would like to marry her. They decide to arrange the marriage of Ranjana to some other decent man, in order to sidestep Ajju as well as Wanted Bhai's son. However, due to Ajju and Dr. Ghunguroo, who are in league with Babita and Poonam, they are caught by Wanted Bhai, who takes them to his island.

At the island, Ajju and Dr. Ghunguroo try to convince Honey that Honey no longer loves Ranjana and that Babita is his true love. Meanwhile, Uday and Majnu try to kill Ajju, but are frightened at the graveyard in a ghost act planned by Dr. Ghunguroo, Ajju and Ranjana. Unbeknownst to all of them, their activities have been recorded by CCTV camera, causing Wanted Bhai and Honey to plan to finish them off. However, in a hilarious climax scene, Honey is kidnapped by all of them and they escape towards the desert where they are chased by Wanted Bhai. In the midst of saving himself, Dr. Ghunguroo pushes Wanted Bhai, causing him to faint. Meanwhile, a group of camels heavily march there. Ajju is successful in saving Wanted Bhai from the stampede of camels, and restoring his sight. Wanted Bhai himself, as a form of gratitude, decides to arrange the marriage of Ajju with Ranjana, calling Ajju his 'second son'. However, they notice another sandstorm conjuring up, making everyone run for their lives, and the movie ends on a cliffhanger.

Cast
Anil Kapoor as Sagar Pandey "Majnu Bhai"  
Nana Patekar as Don Uday Shetty Bhai 
 Patekar also portrays Shankar Shetty, Uday and Ranjana's father.
John Abraham as Ajay Barsi "Ajju Bhai" Freedom Fighter , Dr. Ghunghroo's stepson and Payal's son 
Shruti Haasan as Ranjana Shetty, Uday's half-sister
Paresh Rawal as Dr. Dayal Ghunghroo, Ajju's stepfather
Ankita Shrivastava as Babita / Rajkumari Chandini
Dimple Kapadia as Poonam / Maharani Padmavati
Naseeruddin Shah as Mansoor Sharif / Wanted Bhai
Shiney Ahuja as Honey Sharif
 Supriya Karnik as Payal Ghungroo
Ranjeet as Vikrant Kapoor
Rajpal Yadav as Tailor
Neeraj Vora as Badshah Khan
Mushtaq Khan as Baljeet "Ballu" Rawat
Adi Irani as Advocate Hariwant Sahni

Special Appearances
Akshay Kumar as Rajiv Saini in archive footage
Feroz Khan as Ranvir Dhanraj Xaka (RDX) in archive footage
Lauren Gottlieb in song "20-20"
Reema Debnath in song "20-20"
 Radhika Bangia in song "20-20"
Sambhavna Seth in song "20-20"
Sakshi Maggo in song "20-20"
Surveen Chawla in song "Tutti Bole Wedding Di"
Snigdha Gupta Mehta in song "Tutti Bole Wedding Di"
Shubhi Sharma in song "20-20"
Katrina Kaif as Sanjana Shetty in archive footage

Production
A large portion of Welcome Back was shot in the United Arab Emirates. It is the first Bollywood film to be shot inside the Emirates Palace in Abu Dhabi. Later, a replica of the Emirates Palace was re-created in Mumbai's Film City to shoot the song "Tutti". A comedy sequence was shot at The Meydan, the world's first five-star track-side hotel, situated at the Meydan Racecourse in Dubai. Other filming locations include the Jumeirah Zabeel Saray Hotel, the Waldorf Astoria Dubai Palm Jumeirah, the Sofitel Hotel – The Palm, the Grand Hyatt Hotel, the Burj Khalifa and Rixos The Palm Dubai. A particular scene was shot in Dubai's Margham Desert, with 1000 camels being arranged for it. It was reported that a pivotal scene was shot on the personal yacht of the Royal Family of Dubai, Al Maktoum. Furthermore, it was said that limited edition luxury and sports automobiles including a Ferrari Spider, a Mansory Carbonado Apertos, an Aston Martin One-77 and a Rolls-Royce Phantom were used in the film.

Soundtrack

The soundtrack for Welcome Back was composed by seven artists: Meet Bros Anjjan, Anu Malik, Mika Singh (each one song in collaboration with Yo Yo Honey Singh and Milind Gaba, Abhishek Ray and Siddhant Madhav. The lyrics were written by Kumaar and Manoj Muntashir. The music rights for the film were acquired by T-Series. The full audio album was released on 6 August 2015.

Critical reception
Bollywood Hungama gave the film 3.5 stars out of and wrote, "if you enjoy slapstick comedy that defies logic and have enjoyed Welcome, then Welcome Back is surely a paisa vasool entertainer for you". Dhriti Sharma, writing for Zee News, stated, Welcome Back is vibrant and the ensemble cast keeps it gripping. The screenplay is brilliant, just a little bit of loops in editing in the first song. The comic flavour of the movie has been kept intact and the direction has been profoundly beaded into scenes". Ananya Bhattacharya from India Today gave it 3 stars out of 5 and wrote, "Welcome Back is quite the laugh riot that can de-stress you after the atrocities of the week. Leave the brains aside, and you have (at least) two hours of hardcore fun". Rohit Vats from Hindustan Times gave the film 2.5 out of 5 and wrote, "Welcome Back is funny in parts, but that Welcome fluidity is missing big time. There are moments but they are very limited in number. Welcome Back'''s pace is its biggest asset and that may make you enjoy this 153-minute long film". Deepanjana Pal from Firstpost wrote, "At 153 minutes, Welcome Back is just a shade too long and the ending is a sandstorm of stupidity. But you'll forgive Bazmee and gang because for at least 120 minutes, this comedy keeps you in splits. Welcome Back might be 2015's silliest film and this is the best reason to watch it". Shilpa Jamkhandikar, writing for Reuters, stated, "Welcome Back is sporadically funny, one that ebbs and flows; but it just about passes the 'guilty pleasure' test thanks to Kapoor and Patekar". Filmfare wrote, "watch the film if you like cornball comedies. It's a pure massy, masala entertainer that's good to go on a lazy weekend". Rediff's Raja Sen, while giving the film 2 stars out of 5, wrote, "Welcome Back is dumb yet entertaining, utterly silly but made with a kind of absurd, warm energy". Shubha Shetty-Saha from Mid-day called the film "a blazing example of the 'Leave your brains at home' variety" and "a fun watch which will keep you snorting and giggling even after you exit the theatre".

Rajeev Masand for News 18 gave the film 2 stars out of 5 and wrote, "It's Nana and Anil, in fact – along with the impossibly gifted Paresh Rawal – who're the real stars of this film, bringing so much manic energy and good-natured stupidity to a familiar, shopworn premise". Shubhra Gupta writing for The Indian Express gave the film 1.5 stars out of 5 and stated, Welcome had a welcome lightness in most of its steps. And it made us laugh. Welcome Back, minus Akshay and Katrina, plus John and Shruti, and Dimple and a new girl, and Naseer and Shiney, clomps about, looking for the laughs. And failing, mostly, to find them". Saibal Chatterjee from NDTV wrote, 'nothing that this nonsensical action comedy unleashes, not even the in-form Anil Kapoor-Nana Patekar pair, can compensate for its absence of substance. Welcome Back...is as appealing as a dunk in a garbage dump'. Livemint's Uday Bhatia wrote, 'Over its cruelly prolonged 150-minute running time, Welcome Back treats human intellect with the sort of disdain that's remarkable even for Bollywood. It's not just that these are old gags; they've been repurposed so lazily that you can see the actors tiring of a scene even as they perform it'.

Box office
The film became a box office success and collected an estimated  in 17 days.

India
The film collected  in its first week. The film grossed around  after three weeks and became the eighth highest grosser of the year.

Overseas

The film has collected $4.25 million plus in the first week. The film collected $1.5 million approx. in gulf and $1 million in US/Canada and around  nett in its second weekend.

Sequel
After the success of two films, the makers are planning a third part of this franchise, reportedly titled 'Welcome To The Jungle'. Producer Firoz Nadiadwala said "It is an all-out action film featuring the army and features some of the most complicated stunts ever filmed in a Hindi movie."  Anil Kapoor, Jackie Shroff, Nana Patekar, Akshay Kumar, John Abraham, Paresh Rawal and Pankaj Tripathi will return for the third installment with Mithun Chakraborty in a special appearance.

References

External links
 
 
 

2015 films
2010s Hindi-language films
2015 action comedy films
Indian action comedy films
Films set in Dubai
Films shot in Dubai
Films scored by Abhishek Ray
Films scored by Meet Bros Anjjan
Films scored by Mika Singh
Indian sequel films
Films scored by Anu Malik
Films scored by Aadesh Shrivastava
Films directed by Anees Bazmee
2015 comedy films